Cason Jay Cooley (born November 28, 1978, in Akron, Ohio) is an American record producer, audio engineer, composer, songwriter, and musician. He was raised in Wichita, Kansas. As a child, Cooley often accompanied his parents, who toured the country as a part of the Cathedral Quartet. In 1997, Cooley moved to Nashville, Tennessee, where he became a member of The Normals in 1998. He toured with the band from 1998 until 2002, when the band broke up.

Cooley is most recognized for his work as a songwriter and producer, and has worked with artists such as Matthew Perryman Jones, Katie Herzig, and Trent Dabbs.  Cooley is also known for his work on Ben Rector's album, Brand New, as well as Ingrid Michaelson's albums, Lights Out and It Doesn't Have to Make Sense.

References

1978 births
21st-century American engineers
Record producers from Ohio
Songwriters from Ohio
Living people